Café Meineid (Café Perjury) is a German courtroom comedy television series based on actual cases. The series aired 147 episodes from 1990 to 2003 and ended with the death of lead actor Erich Hallhuber.

External links
 

1990 German television series debuts
2003 German television series endings
German-language television shows
Television shows set in Munich
Das Erste original programming
German legal television series
Bayerischer Rundfunk